Cleon Nicholas Daskalakis (born September 29, 1962) is an American former professional hockey goaltender. He played 12 games in the National Hockey League with the Boston Bruins between 1984 and 1987.

Early life and education
Daskalakis was born in Boston and played college hockey for the Boston University Terriers men's ice hockey team. He was named to the Eastern College Athletic Conference All-Star Second Team in 1982–83 and First Team in 1983–84. He was also named to the National Collegiate Athletic Association (East) All-American First Team, 1983–84.

Career 
Daskalakis signed as a free agent by the Boston Bruins, June 1, 1984. and played in 12 National Hockey League games for the Bruins between 1984 and 1987, winning three games, losing four and tying one.

Daskalakis also represented United States at the 1989 World Ice Hockey Championships.

He is the president of Celebrities for Charity and the agent for Troy Brown of the New England Patriots and NHL player Sergei Samsonov. Daskalakis is also a member of Boston University Athletics Hall of Fame.

Career statistics

Regular season and playoffs

International

Awards and honors

References

External links
 

1962 births
Living people
American people of Greek descent
American men's ice hockey goaltenders
Binghamton Whalers players
Boston Bruins players
Boston University Terriers men's ice hockey players
Hershey Bears players
Ice hockey people from Boston
Jokerit players
Milwaukee Admirals (IHL) players
Moncton Golden Flames players
Rochester Americans players
Undrafted National Hockey League players
AHCA Division I men's ice hockey All-Americans